The New Zealand Cycle Trail project (Māori: Nga Haerenga, "The Journeys") is a New Zealand government initiative, co-funded together with local councils and charitable trusts, which is to build and operate a network of cycle routes through the country.

As of mid-2011, the first of the 18 proposed 'Great Rides' (dedicated cycleways, mostly off-road and in particularly scenic locations) were being finished, while construction was ongoing on most of the others. The first set of 'Touring Routes' (mostly on-road, to connect Great Rides), had also been announced. At the end of 2013, with the initial $50 million (plus local co-funding) essentially all spent or allocated, about 19 routes were expected to be in operation.

History 

Originally called the New Zealand Cycleway, and later the National Cycleway Project, it was initially conceived as a cycling route to run through the length of New Zealand, "from Kaitaia to Bluff". It was proposed by then Prime Minister John Key as the 21st "surprise" item of the national job summit held by the New Zealand Government in early 2009.

John Key, who was also Minister of Tourism, noted that as of the middle of March 2009, officials were working "actively and aggressively" on a plan to implement the cycleway, though the original idea of a direct route was abandoned in favour of linking a network of existing paths and new sections, which Key termed 'Great Rides' in allusion to the New Zealand Great Walks system of famous tramping or hiking tracks. The individual routes are to be connected into a New Zealand-wide network in the long term.

John Key noted that to retain momentum on the process, the first sections to be funded would be publicised by June 2009. This was slightly pushed out until July 2009, when the first seven projects were announced, to receive $9 million in funding. In November 2009, construction started on the Waikato River Trails, the first of the quick-start projects, which received $3 million in funding to construct 41 km of track and thereby finish a 100 km long cycle trail along the Waikato River.

In the second stage of the project, it was announced in February 2010 that out of 54 applications (beyond the quick-start trails), 13 had been selected to receive funding (pending further feasibility studies). If all these trails and the quick-start trails were realised, they would provide over 2,000 km of trail. In September 2010, funding for another five tracks was confirmed, bringing the total up to 18.

On 2 July 2010, Prime Minister John Key opened the first segment completed with cycle trail funding, being the 'Old Coach Road' segment of the Ruapehu to Whanganui Nga Ara Tuhono trail. By November 2010, eight trails were under construction, and the first full "Great Ride", the St James Trail located near Hanmer Springs, opened in November 2010.

In mid-2011, it was announced that Sarah Ulmer would be the official 'ambassador' for the New Zealand Cycle Trail. In May 2011, a customer-focused website was launched for the trails.

In January 2012, the most famous existing cycle route of the country, the Otago Central Rail Trail, became a part of the Cycle Trail umbrella organisation.

In February 2013, it was announced that with most project and funding-allocation work completed after 4 years, the number of permanent NZCT staff would be reduced from 7 to 3.

In mid 2016, another $25 million of funding (plus associated local Council co-funding) was announced by government, with approximately $13m of the funding planned to pay for connecting four Great Rides cycle trails in Central Otago into a connected 536 km track network. The remainder of the funds would be open for local applications.

Characteristics

Project scope 

The cycleway was originally proposed to be a continuous route with a concrete surface, and it was proposed that the Department of Conservation was to supervise the construction process. Cycling advocates noted that having the feasibility study undertaken by the Ministry of Tourism, rather than the Ministry of Transport, boded well for the future of the project.

In the middle of March 2009, comments started to emerge from government indicating that the initial vision of a single track throughout the country would probably not be realised, at least not in the same form. Rather, it was now envisaged that a whole network of tracks would be created, combined from existing part sections, or upgraded from other forms of tracks and roads. The tracks would likely be to different standards in different areas, as some estimates have set the cost for the original proposal of a full track formed in concrete at least $300m rather than the $50m initially suggested.

Setting out further specifics, in May 2009 it was confirmed that instead of a single route throughout New Zealand, the project would, at least initially, concentrate on a number of promising individual links. Substantial parts of these routes could use existing railway corridor reserves or possibly paper roads, or existing cycle infrastructure, where present. They would also have the ability to run through conservation land where appropriate, and take into account existing tourist destinations, thus providing particularly interesting routes.

Prime Minister John Key, in mid-2010, noted that he expected 2,000 km of cycleway to be completed by the end of 2011.

Intended benefits 

The intention of the trail, apart from creating jobs in an economic downturn (both in construction and later in the tourism industry associated with it), is to provide local and international cycle tourists with a route to travel on. Cycle Action Auckland noted in an editorial that the Otago Central Rail Trail had brought substantial benefits to an otherwise struggling rural region, and had been assessed as supporting up to 1,000 full and part-time jobs in the region, and that the tourism benefits of a national cycleway would likely be similar. Cycling Advocates' Network supports the proposal as encouraging cycling in New Zealand, while walking advocates also see benefits to be gained from such a route. Tourism New Zealand noted that the project could also provide a much-needed boost to the viability and funding of many cities' languishing cycling strategies and plans.

Ministry of Tourism figures show that so far (as of 2009), only about 2% of all tourists to New Zealand undertake cycling as part of their activities. The data did however also indicate that cycling tourists stay more than twice as long as the average tourists, and during their time in the country spend about 1.6 times as much as the average tourist. Tourism New Zealand also noted that so far, there was effectively no promotion of New Zealand cycling to overseas tourists, even though it was a significant tourism industry in places like Europe.

Estimates for the quick-start projects estimate that each might occupy approximately 40 people in the initial construction period. Prime Minister John Key noted that he expected about 500 jobs to be provided in construction of the cycleways in total, with up to 4,000 eventually created through tourism benefits the trails would bring. In mid-2011, the newsletter of the New Zealand Cycle Trail reported 511 people employed on trail construction. Job experiences from the Far North District were also positive – among other effects, it was reported that of 110 formerly unemployed young people who worked on the project for half a year as part of a government subsidy scheme, 80 had gone on to other work, rather than returning to the dole.

Funding 

In May 2009, the government announced that $50 million had been allocated for the cycleway in the budget for the coming three years, provided by the Ministry of Tourism. It was hoped that local authorities and other entities would also provide further sums, with co-funded projects receiving priority for money from the budget.

Of the total sum, $2.5m have been set aside for management and advisory functions in the Ministry of Tourism, while $47.5m will be used to create the National Cycleway Project Fund, from which successful applicants will draw money for construction of routes. By September 2010, $45.6m had been allocated to track construction, and had attracted a further $30m in co-funding from local Councils and other organisations.

In July 2010, it was announced that 8 of the 13 cycle trails had received the go-ahead, four needed further study, and one (Tauranga Moana) had been rejected, due to land-use/access issues making the proposal unfeasible in the short term. $18.8 million have been set aside for the approved tracks, with the local authorities adding another $16 million to the project costs. Five more tracks from the list were approved in September 2010.

Among the projects that had applied for funding from the new fund after the scope was changed are routes in urban Auckland, as well as on Waiheke Island and Great Barrier Island. However, none of these were successful, though Nikki Kaye, National MP for Auckland, and other sponsors of the proposals, such as Cycle Action Auckland were optimistic that deserving projects like the Waiheke Cycle Trail would still be realised by other means.

In February 2014, Prime Minister John Key announced $8 million worth of maintenance funding over four years for the New Zealand Cycle Trail Great Rides

In May 2016, another $25m of new-route funding was announced.

Routes

Great Rides

North Island
 Great Lake Trail
 Hauraki Rail Trail – from Paeroa to Waihi and Paeroa to Thames
 Hawke’s Bay Trails
 Motu Trails
 Mountains to Sea – two new trails covering 245 km in Tongariro and Whanganui National Parks
 Remutaka Cycle Trail
 Te Ara Ahi – Thermal by Bike
 Timber Trail – Originally called Central North Island Rail Trail and proposed as a 60 km trail, but 83 km have been built
 Twin Coast Cycle Trail – In the Far North runs  from Opua to the Māngungu Mission west of Horeke
 Waikato River Trails – two new sections from in the south Waikato, completing a  track, opened in November 2011

South Island
Alps 2 Ocean Cycle Trail
 Around the Mountains Cycle Trail –  trail
 Clutha Gold Trail
 Coppermine Trail
 The Old Ghost Road
 Otago Central Rail Trail – Created as a cycle trail in 2000, joined the NZCT system in 2012
 Queen Charlotte Track – Created as a walking track, joined the NZCT system in 2013
 Queenstown Trail
 Roxburgh Gorge Trail
 St James Cycle Trail – 64 km grade 3 loop mountain bike trail built by the Department of Conservation
 Tasman’s Great Taste Trail
 West Coast Wilderness Trail

Touring Routes

In mid-2011, the New Zealand Cycle Trail announced a second type of route, the "touring route". Composed mainly of existing on-road routes (rather than new dedicated cycleways), these routes are to start linking the various Great Rides and New Zealand in general with officially designated cycling routes, chosen for scenic appeal and suitability for cycling (low motor vehicle traffic volumes etc...). The first three such routes announced, all centred on Taumarunui in the central north island, were:
 Taumarunui to New Plymouth (including part of the Forgotten World Highway)
 Taumarunui to Whakahoro (linking to the Ruapehu-Whanganui Trails)
 Taumarunui to Ongarue (linking to the Pureora Timber Trail)

Public reactions 
Pre-opening
While many cycling groups and tourism interests such as Tourism New Zealand greeted the project with enthusiasm, there has also been scepticism, mainly related to the potential costs of the project, and the scope for economical benefits. Editorialist Brian Rudman has also claimed that the cycleway idea smacked of Depression Era make-work schemes for the working classes. Others have countered the criticism noting that the money spent on the cycleway would go back into the New Zealand economy in any case, and leave the country with a lasting infrastructural benefit.

Editorialists have remarked that the Prime Minister remained clearly behind the project he helped launch, despite criticism about changes in the estimated costs, and the shift from the initial concept of a single track towards a network.

The project has also created enthusiasm among some business groups, with, for example, a meeting of 130 Waikato business and government representatives endorsing it for the tourism, health and economic benefits it could bring to Hamilton and the Waikato. Also supportive was the New Zealand Contractors' Federation, which considered that it would be very beneficial for many small and medium enterprises during hard economic times.

The cycleway project is also seen as a potential lifeline for small town such as Kumara on the West Coast. The small town, a former gold mining centre, now has only a few hundred inhabitants left, and is facing the closure of its only remaining store. Westland's Mayor Maureen Pugh noted that the Westland Wilderness Trail, which was selected as one of the 13 Phase II trails, could be a "saving grace" by bringing tourism into the area. Similar hopes have been expressed by locals in towns like Kaikohe in Northland. Occasionally, locals, especially farmers, have however expressed concerns that vandalism would occur when tourists on bikes travelled through previously inaccessible areas, though experiences from the Otago Rail Trail indicates that such fears are overstated.

See also 
 Cycling in New Zealand

References

Further reading 
 
 Gerald Cunningham – 2013 – Guide to the Alps 2 Ocean Cycle Trail
 Gerald Cunningham – 2013 – Guide to the Queenstown Cycle Trail

External links 

 Nga Haerenga, The New Zealand Cycle Trail (official USER website for NZ cycle trail project)
New Zealand Cycling Network map
 Great Rides on NZByBike (marketing New Zealand cycle tourism)
 Cycle Trails New Zealand  (New Zealand Trails website for local and international tourism)

 
Tourism in New Zealand
Cycle Trail